Sabia australis is a species of small limpet-like sea snail, a marine gastropod mollusk in the family Hipponicidae, the hoof snails.

Description

Distribution
This species occurs in the Red Sea and in the Indian Ocean off Madagascar

References

 Dautzenberg, Ph. (1929). Contribution à l'étude de la faune de Madagascar: Mollusca marina testacea. Faune des colonies françaises, III(fasc. 4). Société d'Editions géographiques, maritimes et coloniales: Paris. 321-636, plates IV-VII pp.

External links

Hipponicidae
Taxa named by Jean-Baptiste Lamarck
Gastropods described in 1819
Fauna of the Indian Ocean